Frans Francken III (1607–1667) was a Flemish Baroque painter and the best known member of the fourth generation of the Francken family of artists.

Life
Francken was born and died in Antwerp.  He was the son of Frans Francken II and Elisabeth Placquet and became a master in the Antwerp Guild of St. Luke in 1639. He was dean of the Guild of St. Luke in 1656-66.

He was the teacher of Carstian Luyckx, and Jan Baptist Segaert.

Work
Frans Francken III is known for genre works and portraits, and painted staffage in the works of Pieter Neeffs I and, more frequently, his son Pieter Neeffs II.  While his figures generally follow his father's style, they are painted with less accuracy.  He was skilled at arranging his figures well in the composition and light.

His cabinet-size history paintings also follow his father's style generally while showing a strong influence of Rubens' style.  As a result, Frans Francken III was sometimes referred to the 'Rubensschen Francken' (the 'Rubensian Francken').

Family tree

References

1607 births
1667 deaths
Flemish Baroque painters
Painters from Antwerp
Frans